Artyomovsky Urban Okrug is the name of several municipal formations (urban okrugs) in Russia. The following administrative divisions are incorporated as such:
Artyom City Under Krai Jurisdiction, Primorsky Krai
Artyomovsky District, Sverdlovsk Oblast

See also
Artyomovsky (disambiguation)

References